Adesmia arenicola is an endemic perennial shrub found in Argentina.

References

arenicola